Mataur is a modern village on the outskirts of Meerut city in the state of Uttar Pradesh in India, 70 km from New Delhi. Most of the farmers here grow sugarcane.

Meerut

 
Mataur is located on G.T. road where providing more facilities. Every type of transport & marketing facilities. It's also known as Chauhan's village. Here, special growth of sugarcane due to near sugar factory.